Lesley Frances Soper (born 5 November 1954) is a former New Zealand politician of the Labour Party.

Political career

She was a Labour Party list member of Parliament for several months in 2005, replacing Jonathan Hunt, and she returned to Parliament in 2007 to fill the vacancy caused by Georgina Beyer's resignation.

Soper first stood for Parliament in 1993. She stood in the Wallace electorate, coming runner-up to National's Bill English. She then proceeded to contest the Clutha-Southland seat since it was created in the 1996 election, again placing second to English on each occasion. Soper was ranked 43rd on Labour's party list in the 2002 election. While initially missing out on entering parliament, she was able to enter Parliament upon the retirement of Jonathan Hunt, being declared elected on 4 April 2005 and sworn in the following day. In the 2005 election, Soper had hoped to contest the Invercargill seat, but was defeated in the nomination process by Wayne Harpur. Her position on the 2005 list was forty-fifth, and she did not return to parliament until 2007.

After her 2014 defeat, Soper declared that she would not stand again. She contested and won a seat on the Invercargill City Council in 2016.

Other activities

In addition to serving as Women's Vice President of the Labour Party, Soper has worked for the Council of Trade Unions and the New Zealand Educational Institute. She has also served on the Southland District Health Board.

Notes

References

External links
Parliament website
Labour Party website

1954 births
Living people
New Zealand Labour Party MPs
Women members of the New Zealand House of Representatives
New Zealand list MPs
Unsuccessful candidates in the 1993 New Zealand general election
Unsuccessful candidates in the 1996 New Zealand general election
Unsuccessful candidates in the 1999 New Zealand general election
Unsuccessful candidates in the 2002 New Zealand general election
Unsuccessful candidates in the 2005 New Zealand general election
Unsuccessful candidates in the 2008 New Zealand general election
Unsuccessful candidates in the 2011 New Zealand general election
Unsuccessful candidates in the 2014 New Zealand general election
Members of the New Zealand House of Representatives
Invercargill City Councillors
21st-century New Zealand politicians
21st-century New Zealand women politicians
Southland District Health Board members